Julia Skripnik (née Matojan; born 10 August 1985) is a retired Estonian tennis player.

On 25 August 2008, Skripnik reached her best singles ranking of world number 866. On 23 June 2008, she peaked at world number 949 in the doubles rankings.

Playing for Estonia at the Fed Cup, Skripnik has a win–loss record of 1–4.

ITF finals (0–1)

Doubles (0–1)

Fed Cup participation

Singles

Doubles

References

External links 
 
 
 

1985 births
Living people
Sportspeople from Tallinn
Estonian female tennis players